Events in the year 1869 in Bolivia.

Incumbents
President: Mariano Melgarejo

Events

Births
July 8 - Daniel Salamanca Urey, President 1931-1934

Deaths

 
1860s in Bolivia
Years of the 19th century in Bolivia